Hee-Jung "Gloria" Park (born 27 February 1980) is a South Korean professional golfer who played mostly on U.S.-based LPGA Tour. She has also used the Westernized name Gloria Park.

Park was born in Seoul, South Korea. After moving to Australia as a teenager, she won the Australian Girls' Amateur three times and won the Australian Women's Amateur Stroke Play Championship in 1997.

After turning professional in 1998, Park won the 1998 Sports Seoul Ladies' Open on the LPGA of Korea Tour and the 1999 Indonesian Ladies' Open. She finished 13th at the 1999 LPGA Final Qualifying Tournament to earn a place on the U.S.-based LPGA Tour for the 2000 season. On the LPGA Tour, she has won the 2001 Williams Championship and the 2002 Sybase Big Apple Classic.

Professional wins (4)

LPGA Tour wins (2)

LPGA Tour playoff record (1–1)

Other wins (2)
1998 Sports Seoul Ladies' Open (LPGA of Korea Tour)
1999 Indonesian Ladies' Open

Results in LPGA majors

CUT = missed the half-way cut
WD = withdrew
"T" = tied

Summary
Starts – 32
Wins – 0
2nd-place finishes – 0
3rd-place finishes – 0
Top 3 finishes – 0
Top 5 finishes – 1
Top 10 finishes – 3
Top 25 finishes – 8
Missed cuts – 10
Most consecutive cuts made – 6 (twice)
Longest streak of top-10s – 1

Team appearances
Amateur
Tasman Cup (representing Australia): 1997 (winners)

Professional
Lexus Cup (representing Asia team): 2005

References

South Korean female golfers
LPGA Tour golfers
Golfers from Seoul
Sportspeople from the Las Vegas Valley
1980 births
Living people